The Discography of Death by Stereo, an American hardcore punk, consist of six studio albums, two live album's, eight music video's, one demo, and have made various appearances on numerous compilation albums.

Studio albums

Live albums

EPs

Demos
Five-Song Demo Tape.  The band's first recording.  4/5 songs went on to be re-recorded and included in their first album. (1998)

Music videos
 Desperation Train (2000)
 Wasted Words (2003)
 I Give My Life (2005)
 Middle Fingers (2005)
 Entombed We Collide (2005)
 I Sing for You (2009)
 Welcome to the Party (2009)
 Growing Numb (2012)
 Rejected (Rancid Cover) (2015)
 Neverending (2016)
 I Think About Killing You Everyday (2016)

Compilations
(Name Of Compilation - Song)
Devils Night (Live Compilation 7 inch including other bands Ensign, Adamantium, Missing 23rd, Eyelid) (1999)
Punk-O-Rama 5 - Lookin' Out For No. 1 (2000)
Punk Goes Metal - Little Fighter (White Lion Cover) (2000)
Punk-O-Rama Vol. 6 - Holding $60 On A Burning Bridge (2001)
Indecision Records Split Series - 3 Songs from Ensign split (2001)
Punk-O-Rama 7 - Wasted Words (Demo Version) (2002)
Punk-O-Rama 8 - Unstoppable (2003)
Bring You To Your Knees (G&R Tribute) - Anything Goes (Cover) (2003)
Punk-O-Rama Vol. 9 - The Plague (Live Oct 03) (2004)
Warped Tour 10 2004 Tour Compilation - Beyond the Blinders (2004)
Masters Of Horror Soundtrack - Bottled Up (From DFL Sessions) (2005)

Compilation DVDs
Punk O Rama The Videos - Desperation Train (2002)
Indecision Video Vault - Various performances and interviews (2003)

Discographies of American artists